Yuxarı Bilnə (also, Verkhnyaya Bilinya and Yukhary Bil’nya) is a village in the Lerik Rayon of Azerbaijan.  The village forms part of the municipality of Livədirgə.

References 

Populated places in Lerik District